Alexander Valeryevich Dyukov (born 3 December 1967) is a Russian businessman serving as the Chairman of the management Board of Gazprom Neft, one of Russia’s top-5 vertically integrated oil companies by production and amongst the largest oil companies in the world by proven reserves. He was also President of FC Zenit Saint Petersburg and is the current President of the Russian Football Union.

Education
Dyukov graduated from Leningrad’s Shipbuilding Institute in 1991 and in 2001 took an IMISP MBA degree at the International Management Institute of Saint Petersburg.

Career

 1996 to 1998 - Chief Financial Officer and Chief Executive Officer of JV CJSC St-Petersburg Oil Terminal. 
 In 1998 he was appointed Economics Director and in 1999 acted as Chief Executive Officer of JSC St-Petersburg Sea Port. 
 In 2000 he resumed his duties in JV CJSC St-Petersburg Oil Terminal as Chairman of the Board of Directors. 
 From February 2003 to November 2006 appointed President of SIBUR. 
 At the end of 2006, he was appointed President of JSC Gazprom Neft and since November 2006 he has been Chairman of the Board of Directors of OAO SIBUR Holding. 
 Since January 2008 has held the position of Chairman of the Management Board and Chief Executive Officer of JSC Gazprom Neft.
 In March 2008 he was appointed as President of the football club Zenit. St. Petersburg
 In 2011 he became Deputy Chairman of the Board of Directors of OAO SIBUR
 In December 2011 his contract was extended by the Board of Gazprom Neft for a further five years.
 Served as the president of Russian Premier League team Zenit St. Petersburg from 2008 to 2017.
 Elected president of the Russian Football Union in February 2019.

References

External links
Interview with Dyukov after UEFA cup success.
Official Zenit website

1967 births
Living people
Sportspeople from Saint Petersburg
FC Zenit Saint Petersburg
Russian football chairmen and investors
Presidents of the Russian Football Union